Tom Rapnouil Zarandona (born 9 February 2001) is a French professional footballer who plays as a midfielder for Bulgarian First League side Botev Vratsa on loan from  club Toulouse.

Club career
Rapnouil made his professional debut with Toulouse in a 2–0 Coupe de France win over Bordeaux on 10 February 2021. In late August 2022, he was loaned out to Bulgarian club Botev Vratsa.

Honours 
Toulouse

 Ligue 2: 2021–22

References

External links
 
 
 Toulouse FC Profile

Living people
2001 births
People from Poissy
Association football midfielders
French footballers
France youth international footballers
Angoulême Charente FC players
Trélissac FC players
Toulouse FC players
Championnat National 3 players
Ligue 2 players